The State Duma of the Russian Empire of the Fourth Convocation was the representative legislative body of the Russian Empire. The Chairman of the Duma was Mikhail Rodzianko. Elected in September 1912.

Elections

Sessions
The State Duma was elected for five years. The Duma worked with annual sessions, within each session, as a rule, two breaks were arranged, at Christmas and at Easter. Each time the Duma was convened and dissolved by the Highest Decrees; in addition, the Duma itself was empowered to arrange breaks in its work. With the outbreak of the First World War, the regular character of the Duma's work was disrupted.

The first session lasted from November 15, 1912 to June 25, 1913, 81 sessions of the General Meeting of the Duma took place.

The second session lasted from October 15, 1913 to June 14, 1914, 111 meetings of the General Meeting of the Duma took place.

On July 26, 1914, an extraordinary one–day session of the Duma took place, dedicated to the allocation of war loans associated with the acute political crisis that preceded the outbreak of the First World War.

The third session began on January 27, 1915; 2 days later, on January 29, immediately after the adoption of the budget, the session of the Duma was declared closed by the emperor.

The fourth session lasted from July 19 to September 3, 1915, after which the Duma was prematurely dissolved by the emperor for vacations, the session then lasted from February 9 to June 20, 1916, 60 meetings of the General Meeting of the Duma were held.

The fifth session began on November 1, 1916. On December 16, the Duma was again dissolved for the holidays. The early dissolution of the Duma turned out to be one of the events that increased the general political tension in the country before the February Revolution. It was widely believed at the time that it was expected that the government would not allow the Duma to convene after the prolonged New Year holidays and would announce its dissolution. However, on February 14, 1917, the emperor announced the continuation of the Duma. At the height of the events of the February Revolution, on February 25, the emperor again suspended the activities of the Duma. The Duma never met again for formal meetings.

On February 27, during a private meeting of members of the Duma, the Provisional Committee of the State Duma was created, which took part in the formation of the Provisional Government, and until the start of its work, that is, February 27 – March 2, it was the self–proclaimed government of Russia. On May 12 – July 19, 1917, eight more private meetings of the Duma were held, which no longer had any legal or political significance.

The Duma was officially dissolved by a decree of the Provisional Government on October 6, 1917 in connection with the appointment of elections to the All–Russian Constituent Assembly.

Composition

The Fourth Duma had pronounced flanks (left and right) with a very moderate center. A total of 442 deputies were elected:
Union of October 17 – 98;
Nationalists and moderate rightists – 88;
Right – 65;
Constitutional Democratic Party – 59;
Progressive Party – 48;
Centrists – 32;
Russian Social Democratic Labour Party – 14 (Mensheviks – 8, Bolsheviks – 6);
Labour Group – 10;
Non–partisan – 7.

Parties of different unions:
Polish Kolo – 9;
Muslims – 6;
Belarusian–Lithuanian–Polish Group – 6.

Leadership 
Chairman of the State Duma — Mikhail Rodzianko.
Deputy Chairmen: Prince Vladimir Volkonsky, Prince Dmitry Urusov.
Secretary — Ivan Dmitriukov.
Deputy Secretaries: Nikolai Antonov, Viktor Basakov, Gaisa Yenikeev, Nikolay Lvov (first deputy), Vasily Shein.

Official documents
First session
 Verbatim Records. Sessions 1–30: (from November 15, 1912 to March 20, 1913) / State Duma, Fourth Convocation, 1912–1913, First Session
 Verbatim Records. Sessions 31–54: (from March 22 to May 24, 1913) / State Duma, Fourth Convocation, 1913, First Session
 Verbatim Records. Sessions 55–81: (from May 27 to June 25, 1913) / State Duma, Fourth Convocation, 1913, First Session
 Verbatim Records. Session 35: April 3, 1913; Session 63: June 4, 1913; Session 78: June 21, 1913; Session 80: July 24, 1913; Session 81: July 25, 1913
 Index to Verbatim Records: (Parts 1–3): Sessions 1–81: (November 15, 1912 – June 25, 1913) / State Duma, Fourth Convocation, 1912–1913, First Session
 Appendices to the Verbatim Records of the State Duma. Issue 1: (No. 1–150) / Fourth Convocation, 1912–1913, First Session
 Appendices to the Verbatim Records of the State Duma. Issue 2: (No. 151–270) / Fourth Convocation, 1912–1913, First Session
 Appendices to the Verbatim Records of the State Duma. Issue 3: (No. 271–365) / Fourth Convocation, 1912–1913, First Session
 Appendices to the Verbatim Records of the State Duma. Issue 4: (No. 366–435) / Fourth Convocation, 1912–1913, First Session
 Appendices to the Verbatim Records of the State Duma. Issue 5: (No. 436–525) / Fourth Convocation, 1912–1913, First Session
 Appendices to the Verbatim Records of the State Duma. Issue 6: (No. 526–637) / Fourth Convocation, 1912–1913, First Session
 Subject Index to the Collection "Supplements to Verbatim Records of the State Duma": Issue 1–6 / Fourth Convocation, 1912–1913, First Session
Second session
 Verbatim Records. Sessions 1–28: (October 15, 1913 – January 21, 1914) / State Duma, Fourth Convocation, 1913–1914, Second Session
 Verbatim Records. Sessions 29–52: (from January 22 to March 19, 1914) / State Duma, Fourth Convocation, 1914, Second Session
 Verbatim Records. Sessions 53–75: (from March 21 to May 5, 1914) / State Duma, Fourth Convocation, 1914, Second Session
 Verbatim Records. Sessions 76–97: (from 7 to 28 May 1914) / State Duma, Fourth Convocation, 1914, Second Session
 Verbatim Records. Sessions 98–111: (from May 30 to June 14, 1914) / State Duma, Fourth Convocation, 1914, Second Session
 Index to Verbatim Records: Parts 1–5: Sessions 1–111: (October 15, 1913 – June 14, 1914) / State Duma, Fourth Convocation, 1913–1914, Second Session
 Appendices to the Verbatim Records of the State Duma. Issue 1: (No. 1–130) / Fourth Convocation, 1913–1914, Second Session
 Appendices to the Verbatim Records of the State Duma. Issue 2: (No. 131–197) / Fourth Convocation, 1913–1914, Second Session
 Appendices to the Verbatim Records of the State Duma. Issue 3: (No. 198–311) / Fourth Convocation, 1913–1914, Second Session
 Appendices to the Verbatim Records of the State Duma. Issue 4: (No. 312–425) / Fourth Convocation, 1913–1914, Second Session
 Appendices to the Verbatim Records of the State Duma. Issue 5: (No. 426–555) / Fourth Convocation, 1913–1914, Second Session
 Appendices to the Verbatim Records of the State Duma. Issue 6: (No. 556–643) / Fourth Convocation, 1913–1914, Second Session
 Appendices to the Verbatim Records of the State Duma. Issue 7: (No. 644–700) / Fourth Convocation, 1913–1914, Second Session
 Appendices to the Verbatim Records of the State Duma. Issue 8: (No. 701–766) / Fourth Convocation, 1913–1914, Second Session
 Appendices to the Verbatim Records of the State Duma. Issue 9: (No. 767–849) / Fourth Convocation, 1913–1914, Second Session
 Appendices to the Verbatim Records of the State Duma. Issue 10: (No. 850–930) / Fourth Convocation, 1913–1914, Second Session
 Subject Index to the Collection "Supplements to Verbatim Records of the State Duma": Issues 1–10 / Fourth Convocation, 1913–1914, Second Session
Third session
 Appendices to the Verbatim Records of the State Duma: Fourth Convocation, 1915, Third Session
Fourth session
 Verbatim Records. Sessions 17–37: (from February 9 to March 15, 1916) / State Duma, Fourth Convocation, 1916, Fourth Session
 Verbatim Records. Sessions 38–60: (March 17 to June 20, 1916) / State Duma, Fourth Convocation, 1916, Fourth Session
 Index to Verbatim Records: Sessions 1–60: (July 19, 1915 – June 20, 1916) / Fourth Convocation, 1915–1916, Fourth Session
 Verbatim Records. Sessions 1–16 (July 19 – September 3, 1915): With an Index Attached to the Verbatim Records / State Duma, Fourth Convocation, 1915, Fourth Session
 Appendices to the Verbatim Records of the State Duma. Issue 1: July 19 – September 3, 1915: (No. 1–57) / Fourth Convocation, 1915–1916, Fourth Session
 Appendices to the Verbatim Records of the State Duma. Issue 2: (No. 58–87) / Fourth Convocation, 1915–1916, Fourth Session
 Appendices to the Verbatim Records of the State Duma. Issue 3: (No. 88–173) / Fourth Convocation, 1915–1916, Fourth Session
 Appendices to the Verbatim Records of the State Duma. Issue 4: (No. 174–289) / Fourth Convocation, 1915–1916, Fourth Session
 Appendices to the Verbatim Records of the State Duma. Issue 5: (No. 290–373) / Fourth Convocation, 1915–1916, Fourth Session
 Subject Index to the Collection "Supplements to Verbatim Records of the State Duma": Issues 1–5 / Fourth Convocation, 1915–1916, Fourth Session
Other
 Verbatim Records of the Private Meeting of Members of the State Duma (Fourth Convocation): 12, 20, 27 May, 3, 5, 28 June, 18 and 19 July 1917

Sources

External links
Members of the State Duma: Portraits and Biographies. Fourth Convocation, 1912–1917 / compiled by M. M. Boiovich – Moscow: Printing House of the Ivan Sytin Partnership, 1913

The First Year of the Life of the Fourth State Duma – Saint Petersburg: Printing House of Z. Sokolinsky, 1913

Government of the Russian Empire
1912 establishments in the Russian Empire
1917 disestablishments in Russia
Russian Empire
Russian Empire